Morbo is Mexican electronica band Morbo's eponymous debut album issued by EMI Music in December 2001.

The track 'Tengo de ti' was originally released in 1992 on Mœnia's failed attempted self-titled debut album known to others as 'El disco perdido' (The Missing album).

Track listing

Personnel

Performing
Juan Carlos Lozano – vocals, guitar
Jay de la Cueva – percussion, bass
Paco Huidobro – drums, guitar
Fanny Chernitsky – backing vocals
String ensemble
Beata Kukawska – violin
Oleg Gouk – violin
Carlos Rosas Bernal – violin
Veronica Medina – violin
Mikhail Gourfinkel – viola

Technical
Juan Carlos Lozano – record production, audio engineering
Paco Huidobro – record production
Jack Chernytzky – musical advising
Joe Chiccarelli – audio mixing
Alejandro Giacomán – audio mixing, audio engineering
Luis Gil – audio engineering
Luis Cortés (Cuarto de Máquinas) – sound recording
José María Surrel – record production assistance

Design
Pico A&D – graphic design
Yvonne Venegas – photography

References

2001 debut albums
Morbo (band) albums
Spanish-language albums